Smutsia is a genus of African pangolins, better known as the African ground pangolins, from subfamily Smutsiinae, within family Manidae. It was formerly considered a subgenus of Manis. Its members are the more terrestrial of the African pangolins.

Etymology
British naturalist John Edward Gray named Smutsia for South African naturalist Johannes Smuts (1808–1869), the first South African to write a treatise on mammals in 1832 (in which he described the species Manis temminckii).

Taxonomy
 Subfamily: Smutsiinae (large African pangolins)
 Genus: Smutsia (African ground pangolin)
 Smutsia gigantea (giant pangolin)
 Smutsia temminckii (ground pangolin)
 †Smutsia olteniensis

Phylogeny
Phylogenetic position of genus Smutsia within family Manidae

References

 
Mammal genera
 
Taxa described in 1865
Taxa named by John Edward Gray